Greatest Hits & Interpretations is the fifth compilation album by Australian singer Tina Arena, released by EMI Music Australia on 7 April 2017. The album is a 2-CD set—the first contains 17 of Arena's hits; the second is an album of interpretations. The interpretations disc includes a duet with Dannii Minogue, singing with Arena for the first time since Young Talent Time. The album was certified gold in Australia in 2019.

Background and release
2017 marks Arena's 40th year in music and the 40th anniversary of her first album, Tiny Tina and Little John. On 2 March, via her Instagram, Arena said: "This year I'm celebrating 40 years in showbiz, who would have thought that 9 year old girl on TV four decades ago would end up here? I couldn't let this year pass without doing something really special, so we've created a new double album". She added "Disc 1 is called 'Retrospective' and it is a definitive collection of all my singles. Disc 2 is called 'Reimagine' and it features some of my favorite musicians, reinterpreting songs from my career".

In a further statement Arena said, "The whole premise of this record for me was about the other artists, how the other artists perceived that body of work. It was about them having the freedom to be able to do it the way they want to do it". Reflecting on the project, Arena adds, "I've always been my harshest critic, that will never change. For me it's all about the quality of the songwriting – it's got to make you feel something and this collection makes me feel something. And I go, "Yes, I've done okay"... I'm proud of the collaborations I've had, of the things I've learned, of the things I continue to learn. I've loved working with the people I've worked with over the years. It's really fulfilling."

The album became available for pre-order on 3 March 2017 and came with the instant grat track "Wouldn't It Be Good", lifted from Arena's 2008 album, Songs of Love & Loss 2.

Reception

Cameron Adams from the Herald Sun said: "This new career overview demonstrates Arena is still fearless - and peerless", adding: "'Chains' should sit with 'You're the Voice' and 'The Horses' as a national anthem."

Jeff Jenkins from Stack Magazine called the album "glorious".

David from AuspOp said the album "includes all her biggest hits spanning almost 30 years, but it also contains some incredible covers by some incredible artists." adding "Whoever came up with this idea is a genius." David said "Everything you’ve ever loved about Tina features across all her greatest hits" but said it's the second disc "where things get really interesting" saying "(the) interpretations of Tina’s songs are so incredibly diverse and breathe new life into her tunes."

Track listing

Charts

Weekly charts

Year-end charts

Certifications

Release history

References

2017 greatest hits albums
Tina Arena compilation albums
EMI Records compilation albums